Henlea is a genus of annelids belonging to the family Enchytraeidae.

The genus has almost cosmopolitan distribution.

Species:
 Henlea adiverticulata Christensen & Dózsa-Farkas, 1999
 Henlea africana Bell, 1954

References

Annelids